50th Birthday Celebration Volume 1 is a live album by the Masada String Trio documenting their performance at Tonic in September 2003 as part of John Zorn's month-long 50th Birthday Celebration concert series.

Reception

The Allmusic review by Sean Westergaard awarded the album 4.5 stars stating "From soloing to comping, bowing to pizzicato techniques, the set is dazzling from start to finish. Only "Malkut" and "Karet" are anything but beautiful, sounding like pieces left more open to free improvisation than the others, and allowing other facets of the players' abilities to come out. The Masada songbook has elicited a rather large number of truly excellent recordings from its various ensembles. Add this one to the list. Recommended."

Track listing

 *misspelled as "Malkut" on album sleeve

Personnel 
Greg Cohen – bass 
Mark Feldman – violin 
Erik Friedlander – cello 
John Zorn – conductor

References

Albums produced by John Zorn
Masada String Trio albums
John Zorn live albums
2004 live albums
Tzadik Records live albums